Colin Gallie (born 9 July 1971 in Falkirk, Scotland) is a British auto racing driver. He is best known for his one-season driving in the British Touring Car Championship in 1997. He entered a 1994 BMW 320i for Team DCRS in the independents cup. He made an impressive start to the season, winning his class in the first two races. For most of the year he was top of the table, but his ageing car struggled with reliability towards the end of the season. He finished third in the independents class behind overall winner Robb Gravett and Lee Brookes in second.

Racing record

Complete British Touring Car Championship results
(key) (Races in bold indicate pole position - 1 point awarded all races) (Races in italics indicate fastest lap)

References

External links
BTCC Pages Profile.

Scottish racing drivers
1971 births
British Touring Car Championship drivers
Living people